Mackenzie Browning is a fictional character from the CBS soap opera The Young and the Restless. The role was most recently portrayed by Kelly Kruger, who portrayed the role from February 19, 2002, to July 1, 2003, and from March 28, 2018, to January 11, 2019. Previously, the role was portrayed by Ashley Bashioum, Nicole Tarantini,  Rachel Kimsey, and Clementine Ford.

Mackenzie is the daughter of Brock Reynolds and granddaughter of Katherine Chancellor. Much of her history revolves around her role in the teen scene of the series, her romance with Billy Abbott, and marriage to J.T. Hellstrom.

Casting
The first actress to portray the character was Ashley Bashioum, who debuted on March 18, 1999. In 2001, whilst Bashioum was battling mononucleosis, the role was temporarily portrayed by Nicole Tarantini. The following year, it was announced that Bashioum would be leaving the role after she was unable to reach an agreement with the producers over the negotiation of her contract. Bashioum last aired on February 15, 2002. The role was immediately recast with Kelly Kruger, who took over on February 19, 2002. In 2003, Kruger was one of three actors let go from the soap opera, with her last airdate on July 1, 2003.

In 2004, Bashioum was asked to reprise the role and returned on April 20. However, after an additional year as the character, Bashioum was let go and another immediate recast was named, Rachel Kimsey. Former co-executive producer John F. Smith issued a statement explaining Bashioum's exit, saying they decided to "move the story in a different direction" and "Ashley's school schedule made it difficult". Her final airdate was March 10, 2005, with Kimsey taking over on March 28. Viewers were reportedly shocked at Bashioum's exit and against another recast, also citing that Kimsey would have been a better recast for Victoria Newman. In March 2006, it was announced that Kimsey had been let go and there were no plans for another recast. She made her last appearance on May 17, 2006.

In March 2009, it was announced that former The L Word star Clementine Ford had been cast as the fourth actress to portray the character. She stated that she knew co-star Greg Rikaart, who portrays Kevin Fisher, and had a "sneaking suspicion" that he had "something to do" with her being cast in the role. She made her debut on April 1, 2009. In September 2010, it was announced that Ford, along with Thad Luckinbill, would be leaving The Young and the Restless. Their final airdate was November 5, 2010.

In February 2018, it was reported that Kruger would be returning to commemorate with the show's 45th anniversary. Kruger returned on March 28, 2018, and departed April 3, 2018. Kruger reappeared on April 26, 2018. 
In April 2018, Soap Opera Digest announced that Kruger would remain on the serial for an "indefinite run", Kruger's return aired on June 22, 2018. Kruger made other appearances on November 7, 2018, January 10 and 11, 2019.

Storylines

1999–2006
Mackenzie, known as Mac runs away from home in St. Louis and finds herself in the local homeless shelter where she befriends Katherine Chancellor (Jeanne Cooper). Mac shows Katherine a letter from her mother, Amanda which reveals that Mac's father is actually Katherine's son, Brock Reynolds (Beau Kazer). Mac, Kay and their friend Birdie move into the Chancellor Estate together much to the dismay of co-owner, Jill Abbott (Jess Walton). Jill's son, Billy (David Tom) returns and causes trouble when he throws a wild party to get back at Jill for grounding him. Mac ends up getting arrested when Jill accuses her of stealing; fortunately, Billy and attorney John Silva help get the charges dropped. Kay fails to find Brock in India and later receives a call that he is dead. A devastated Mac disappears forcing Billy and their friend Raul (David Lago) to search for her. Mac wanders into the local coffee house, Crimson Lights and is taken in by Nina McNeil (Tricia Cast). Mackenzie returns to the estate to pack her things when she is finally introduced to Brock, who is very much alive. Mac and Raul grow closer while Billy watches in jealousy. During J.T. Hellstrom (Thad Luckinbill)'s party, Billy collapses from alcohol poisoning and Raul saves his life. Though Billy and Mackenzie are at odds, she stays at his bedside and prays for his recovery. Billy and Mac are later voted prom king and queen when she beats out Brittany Hodges (Lauren Woodland) for the vote. The two finally admit how much they care for one another much to Jill's dismay. As Jill threatens to find Amanda to send Mackenzie back home, the two start seeing each other in secret and Billy gives Mac an opal ring as a symbol of their love. When Billy, Brittany and Raul are chosen to represent Glo by Jabot Kids, Mac helps Phyllis Summers with running the website. Brittany finds out about Billy and Mac's romance and arranges for Mac to walk in on her and Billy "making love" when she drugs him and fakes it. Billy tries to explain himself to a heartbroken Mac and it is J.T. who reveals that Mac and Billy have been seeing one another and that Brittany set her up. Billy and Brittany reconciled while Raul broke up with Mac for Rianna Miner (Alexis Thorpe). Mac and Billy are drawn together, and with help from his older brother, Jack (Peter Bergman), they soon begin dating with Jill's blessing when she learned of Brittany's schemes.

Afraid that Mac's mother, Amanda, would show up in Genoa City and take Mackenzie back, Katherine petitioned and was awarded legal custody of Mac. That eased Mac's fears of discovery, and she agreed to join the on-screen Glo by Jabot Kids. When Amanda did show up, Mac rebuffed her and sent her away. But Amanda had divorced and run away from her husband, Ralph, too, and was living at the same homeless shelter where Mac and her father were volunteers. With Billy's help, Mac and her mother accepted each other in their lives again.

Things went fine for Billy and Mackenzie for several months. He helped her admit that she ran away from St. Louis because her stepfather, Ralph, had molested her, and her mother wouldn't believe it. Senior year began, and a holiday series on the Glo by Jabot website added J.T. and Mac to the Glow Kids. The scene changed to Jabot where a boutique opened, which was run by the kids. Phyllis had taken a job with Brash & Sassy, so a new Webmaster, Sean Bridges, was hired. Mac was in her senior year of high school, and was sending out college applications.

After the holidays, Billy realized that he was ready for more from his relationship with Mackenzie. When he shared his feelings with her, he tried to avoid pressuring her, but couldn't accept her insistence that she was not ready and should wait. As a result, the two of them broke up. They got over the trauma and became friends. Then Mac's stepfather, Ralph, showed up in Genoa City and began stalking her. He coerced Mac's mom, Amanda, into helping him steal from the Chancellor Estate. Amanda let him into the mansion while all were at the prom, but Mac returned home unexpectedly and, much to her horror, was met by Ralph.

Billy arrived on the scene as Ralph was about to molest Mac again, confronted him, and whacked Ralph over the head with a fireplace poker. Thinking he had killed Ralph, Billy took Mac to hide out in their special place, the old Abbott playhouse. Thinking they were doomed, Billy and Mac realized they still loved each other. Ralph kidnapped Kay after she returned from chaperoning at the prom, and tied her up in a motel room. Ralph, disguised as a cop, talked Raul into telling him places where he might find Mac and Billy.

Meanwhile, Larry Warton found and rescued Kay. Ralph showed up at the playhouse, too late, but found the kids at a campsite where Raul and Billy used to play as kids. Ralph knocked out Billy by whacking him over the head with a rock and grabbed Mac, but our hero, Larry, showed up in time to rescue her. Larry and Ralph fought, and just before the police arrived, both ended up going over a cliff to the lakeshore below.

The next morning Ralph came to and tried to kill an unconscious Larry with a rock. Scared away by the arrival of the police, Ralph disappeared into the bushes. Larry recovered with minor injuries and major thanks from Billy's mother, Jill, for saving her son's life. Because Jill had video evidence that Amanda had stolen her jewels, and after Amanda nearly got both her own daughter and Jill's son killed, Amanda agreed to leave town if Jill would drop the charges.

After all he went through that summer, Billy decided he needed to do more with his life than go to college, so he left for Louisiana to help Mac's father, Brock, build houses for the poor. He and his mother, Jill, shared a tearful parting, although Jill felt he was making a mistake. Mac and Billy parted tearfully, as well, declaring their love and promising each other that it was not the end of them.

Mac left Genoa City that fall to attend Northwestern University. Both Billy and Mac returned to Genoa City for Christmas, and decided to attend GCU where they share a loft apartment with Raul and Brittany. By spring, Billy had proposed and Mac and Billy were to be married, with Raul Gutierrez as best man and Colleen Carlton as maid of honor. But with the reveal that Billy's mother, Jill's, actual birth mother was Katherine Chancellor, their lives were shattered when they realized they were cousins. Mac and Billy both left town on their own, devastated by the news.

Mac returned to Genoa City after spending time in the Southwestern U.S. helping out teaching kindergarten and preschool children on an Indian reservation. Her grandmother, Katherine, who had fallen off the wagon, was thrilled to see her. Mac found it difficult to live in the same house as a drunken Katherine and Jill, who hated her, so she moved back into the loft apartment with J.T., Brittany, and Raul. Kay had since become sober again,

Victor Newman, as part of his community service sentence for commercial bribery, was restoring an old building into a recreation center in a seedy part of town. He hired Mac as his supervisor on the project. 20-year-old Mac began to get close with Daniel Romalotti, who had a similar parentless background. But J.T. was only too glad to spill Daniel's secret that he was only 16 to Mac, and Mac called it quits. Mac began dating J.T., and Raul moved out of the loft to attend Pemberton University in Boston. ?

Mac convinced J.T. that he really loved Brittany, but he wasn't able to tell her before Brittany married Bobby Marcino, so he reverted to his playboy past. Mac was able to get Kevin Fisher to open up to her, and convinced him to go to a psychiatrist. Kevin appeared to be learning how to deal with his past and handled it well when he realized that Mac was not interested in him as more than a friend.

J.T. had been assisting Paul Williams with his detective work on various cases while attending Genoa City University. Meanwhile, Mac and J.T. got closer, and she finally lost her virginity to him. But in an intricate plot to keep the mob away from Brittany and her unborn baby, they set it up to look like J.T. was the father, and Bobby and Brittany staged a split. For her safety, Mac wasn't included in the plot, and this "revelation" broke her heart.

Nikki started nosing around and uncovered the plot, and ended up getting kidnapped by Vinny's goon, Luca. Paul, Victor, and Bobby rescued Nikki, while J.T. took a distraught Brittany to the Newman Ranch. Luckily, Mac showed up as Brittany went into labor, and Mac delivered the two-month premature baby, Joshua. Vinny, Angelo, and his goon ended up in jail, Brittany and the baby in the hospital, and Bobby turned over his evidence on the mob and went into the witness protection program, leaving Brittany and Joshua behind.

J.T. confessed to Mac it was all a hoax, that he really loved Mac, but she was reluctant to trust him again. Katherine Chancellor convinced J.T., Brittany, and her baby to come live at the Chancellor Estate with Mac, as it would be the most secure for all of them. Months went by, and finally Brittany shared a short visit with the heavily guarded Bobby. Not long afterward, she received word that a hit-and-run driver had killed Bobby.

Brittany was devastated, and she and Joshua ending up moving to New York City with her parents. Mac and J.T. moved into the loft apartment with roommates Kevin and Scott Grainger. Kevin became close friends with Mackenzie again, and they decided to go into business together. They convinced Nick and Sharon to sell Crimson Lights, and began running it together.

About the time Colleen returned to Genoa City intent on making Mac jealous, Mac discovered that she was pregnant with J.T.'s baby. She couldn't bring herself to tell him, but she told her grandmother Kay and Kevin. It wasn't until she miscarried that J.T. found out and was livid that she hadn't told him, yet confided in Kevin instead, so J.T. had a one-night stand with Victoria Newman.

Mac and J.T. broke up, and Mac moved out of the loft and back into the Chancellor Estate. She was getting closer with Kevin, then suddenly returned to the Indian reservation. Mac later returned to tell Kevin she was going to go to New Orleans to work with her father, Brock, and signed a power of attorney turning the coffee house over to Kevin. When Mac did not show up for her grandmother Katherine's funeral, Brock said she was ill and living in Darfur in the Sudan, Africa, following in his footsteps of helping out the needy.

2009–10
In April 2009, after Brock let her know that Katherine was alive, Mac showed up at the Chancellor mansion just in time for Billy's marriage to Chloe. Meanwhile, in the next room, the results of Brock's blood test proved that he was Kay's son, and that Jill was not Katherine's daughter after all, which meant that Billy and Mac were not related either. Their reactions to the news made it quite obvious that both have never gotten over each other. After some persuasion by Murphy that Kay needed her, Mac decided to stay in Genoa City, which made Chloe concerned for her marriage.

Mac's old friend Kevin was committed for his own good after his arrest for bank robbery. Kevin became near-catatonic and delusional in a padded cell, and was OK with Mackenzie and Michael’s visits.

Mac's eighty-year-old grandmother, Katherine, married Patrick “Murph” Murphy in the Chancellor garden in a service officiated by her son Brock. Nikki was matron of honor, Victor best man (because Kevin was still locked up), Amber and Mac were bridesmaids. Ana sang “Let Met Call you Sweetheart”, and the catering was by Joe’s Diner, complete with chicken nuggets. Amber designed Kay’s white lace suit dress, and Nikki caught the bouquet. Michael got Kevin out on bail just in time to attend. Billy and Mac danced and shared how this wedding reminded them of their own long ago. Mac resisted Billy’s advances, and when he grabbed and kissed her, she slapped him. Chloe saw it, kissed his smarting cheek, and took him home.

Billy was upset when Cane bought his favorite escape, Jimmy’s Bar, but was elated when he hired Mac as a waitress, and began spending even more time there, avoiding Chloe. Billy keeps lamenting about their missed opportunity for happiness, and Mac keeps reminding him they have both moved on.

On Memorial Day 2009, Kay and Murphy threw a bar-b-q around the Chancellor pool with Esther, Billy, Chloe & Delia, Mac, Amber, Nina, and Jack in attendance. Later Sharon, Neil & Tyra, Kevin & Jana arrived. Raul Guittierez surprised everyone when he walked in. After reuniting with Billy and being introduced to Kay's new husband Murphy, Billy's new wife Chloe and their baby, Mac walked in and they embraced and passionately kissed. Mac had earlier revealed that there was someone she worked with in Darfur, Africa, and their year-long relationship was "serious, but didn't work out" - and it turned out to be Raul. After Billy reluctantly gave them his blessing, Raul asked Mac to marry him and return to Washington DC with him, and she said yes. But the more time Mac spent with Billy, the more she doubted her future with Raul. Chloe saw this coming and got Raul to return from DC, but it was only for Mac to tell him she was sorry, but the engagement was off. Billy and Mac were about to make love when Chloe interrupted with the news that the paternity test on Sharon's baby was about to come back. Mac did not take the news well that Billy might be the father of his brother's wife’s child, and left. But Mac realized this happened when they were not together, and after seeing Billy talking to God about saving Summer for him despite all his sins, she decided he was still the man she loved.

Sharon got the paternity test results back and was ecstatic that she and Nick are expecting the daughter Faith that Cassie predicted on her death bed and in Nick's dream. But after seeing Nick so distraught over his daughter Summer being in a coma, she realized that he needed to be there for Summer and Phyllis, and not run off with her like he did over Cassie, so she told everyone her baby was Jack's.

Billy and Mac faked being mad at each other at Kay’s 4th of July party, both made excuses and met at the Athletic Club to finally make love after all those years apart, but were interrupted by a phone call that Kay had another mini-stroke and was rushed to the hospital by ambulance.

Cane sold Jimmy's Bar to Mackenzie when he decided to leave town. But when Mac heard that Lily was in the hospital with ovarian cancer, and about to undergo surgery, she tracked down Cane, persuaded him not to leave town, and stashed him in Murphy's trailer home that Billy had just bought as a rendezvous for them. Every time Mac and Billy met there, they had some intimate moments and memories, but always seemed to get interrupted by something, but have finally make love after a six-year wait.

Victor called a press conference and named Mary Jane Benson as the person who hurt his grand daughter, so the entire city was looking for her. Mary Jane was discovered by Mac in an alley, and she befriended her thinking she was just a homeless person, giving her food, blankets and a place to stay in the back room at her bar. Meanwhile, Jack and Paul banded together to find her themselves. After Victor asked for JT's resignation, Paul talked JT into joining him in a new detective partnership, and he became involved in the Mary Jane Benson investigation. JT discovered through Mac that she had been hiding out at her bar, stolen from her and disappeared, leaving a note that claimed Victor knew all about Mary Jane.

After Mac admitted to Chloe that she and Billy were now together, Chloe got a divorce started, and Chance felt free to date Chloe. But when they met to sign the divorce papers, Billy started remembering the good times in the past, and backed out making excuses. So Chloe decided to use Chance to make Billy jealous and stay with her and Delia. Billy went back and signed the next day, but Chloe never did and they remained legally married, though separated. But after Chance was stabbed trying to stop a robber, Chloe realized how much she really cared and signed the divorce papers.

Mac wanted to help Lily and Cane by being a surrogate mother for them, but Billy refused to let her do it. Billy was not happy when Mackenzie volunteered and began looking into the legal ramifications with Michael Baldwin. Mac got a physical, and told Cane she was ready no matter what Billy does not want her to do. Mac and Billy broke up, and Mac became pregnant with Cane and Lily's child, which turned out to be twins. Billy's life was spiraling downward again into drunkenness as he watched Chance take his place with Chloe and his daughter Delia, and after losing the love of his life, Mac. Then an end-of-2009 visit from his dead father John, showing him what the future would be like with Billy dead if he kept this up, began to turn Billy around. He cleaned up the magazine’s reputation and mended fences with Jack and Mac, although Mac is still wary of him. But when it was time for Cane to be deported, she broke down and told Cane the truth, so of course he escaped. But just as he was apprehended, Michael saved the day with the news that he had arranged for Cane to stay legally because of Lily’s condition. A sonogram confirmed that the twins Mac was carrying were boy and girl. Olivia approached Lily with an experimental procedure using stem cells from the babies’ placentas that could save her life, but both Lily and Mac turned it down fearing it may harm the babies. Instead Lily left for Europe with Olivia to try an experimental procedure, without Cane who would not be allowed back in if he left the country. Cane then decided to sue Mac for the right to take the placenta fluid against their wishes.

More and more, JT was left alone at home caring for Reed while Mackenzie grew larger pregnant with Cane and Lily’s twins, and she would often come by to help and they grew close again. Meanwhile, Victoria was enjoying an affair with Billy Abbott. Victoria’s appeal for custody of Reed was lost because Tucker reported to the court that Victor kept J.T. from arriving in time. To top it off her divorce decree arrived later, so to get away and forget their problems, Victoria and Billy took the next plane to Kingston, Jamaica, with no luggage or plans. They joined a Jamaican wedding party on the beach where rum and Billy’s teasing and charm made him the life of the party. He made her laugh and smile again telling everyone about their love/hate relationship. Deliriously drunk, they got married too. Meanwhile, Mac, J.T., and Reed went for a drive in his GTO and ended up at a drive in movie watching The Three Stooges and eating nachos. They began to realize they had more in common now than ever, and the old spark was still there. As JT said, “The stuff you never see coming, is exactly what you want.”

J.T. confessed to Mac that Tucker wanted a favor for helping him get custody of Reed. He needed information from Victoria’s files on a deal that Victor made years ago with Mitsukoshi department stores which caused his legal problems with them to go away. Tucker was hoping this information would seal the deal for him to get Beauty of Nature away from Newman to merge it with his company, Jabot. After Billy caught J.T. typing on Victoria’s laptop, and having secretive meetings with Tucker, he rehired Jill and assigned her to investigate what was going on between Tucker and the Newmans.

Rafe invited his friends to a party at Jimmie’s Bar to celebrate the opening of his private law practice. On his arm was his new boyfriend, Tyler. Billy and Victoria attended but kept their distance. Abby had been trying to coerce Billy into funding and publicizing her television reality show “The Naked Heiress”, but because he refused she congratulated them on their marriage and played their Jamaican wedding video on her phone when no one believed her. J.T. and Mac, who have since reunited as a couple, were appalled.

On September 8, 2010, the day Billy married Victoria, Mac made it clear to J.T. that she doesn't approve nor like his constant bashing of Victoria in front of Reed. In September, Mac and J.T. discover that she is pregnant with their second child, the first ending in a miscarriage. In October, J.T. proposed to Mac, but she said no. That night a powerful storm/tornado hits the GC area. J.T. is found unconsciousness by Lily and Cane. However, after almost losing him due to this incident, and the realization of how her life would be without J.T. to love in it, she finally accepts his proposal. On November 5, J.T and Mac got married with Katherine's help. After Mackenzie receives a job offer, she and JT move to Washington, D.C., taking Victoria's son Reed. Victoria is devastated. On June 21, 2011, Mackenzie gives birth to a son, Dylan. In 2016, Reed returns, and Victoria revealed that J.T. and Mackenzie had another child recently. J.T. later revealed that they had a daughter named Becca.

2018–19
JT returned to Genoa City and it is revealed that he and Mac are getting divorced and she is suing for full custody of their children.  In 2018, Mac returns to Genoa City to attend the Walnut Grove reunion. She get into an argument with J.T. and tries to convince Victoria that she is making a mistake by letting J.T. back into her life.  At Crimson Lights, she details how emotionally abusive J.T. was with her and how she managed to get away from him.  After J.T. turns up "missing", Mac comes to Victoria wanting answers.

References

Browning, Mackenzie
Browning, Mackenzie
Browning, Mackenzie
Browning, Mackenzie